Prince Stefan Carl Manfred Alfred Alexander Joseph Maria of Liechtenstein (born 14 November 1961) is Liechtenstein's Ambassador Extraordinary and Plenipotentiary to the Holy See and former Ambassador to Germany and Switzerland.

Personal life 

Prince Stefan was born in Klagenfurt, Austria, and grew up on the family estate in Rosegg, a Carinthian town close to the Slovenian border. His parents are Prince Alexander of Liechtenstein and Princess Josephine of Löwenstein-Wertheim-Rosenberg. Prince Stefan and his twin brother, the physician Prince Christian, are the elder two of the couple's three sons, the third one being Prince Emanuel. Prince Stefan belongs to the most junior extant line of the House of Liechtenstein, being descended from Prince Johann I Joseph's son Eduard Franz. His maternal uncle is Alois-Konstantin, 9th Prince of Löwenstein-Wertheim-Rosenberg, and he is distantly related to Liechtenstein's present sovereign, Prince Hans-Adam II.

Prince Stefan entered a dynastic marriage with Countess Florentine of Thun and Hohenstein in Vienna on 18 June 1988. Prince Stefan and Princess Florentine have four children: Prince Lukas (b. 1990), Prince Konrad (b. 1992), Princess Anna (b. 1994), and Princess Rita (b. 1999).

Education and career 

Having attended school in Carinthia, Prince Stefan studied business administration at the University of Innsbruck. At the beginning of 1987, he received his master's degree. From 1988 until 1991, he worked for the Union Bank of Switzerland (UBS) in Zurich, and then for the same bank in Frankfurt as director for investment banking until 1995. From 1995 until 2001, Prince Stefan and his younger brother Emanuel ran a tourism project on the family estate in Rosegg.

Prince Stefan became Ambassador of Liechtenstein to Switzerland in June 2001. He performed the function until the summer of 2007. In March 2007, he became Liechtenstein's third Ambassador Extraordinary and Plenipotentiary to Germany. In 2008, German authorities accused Liechtenstein of using its status as tax haven to help tax evaders escape prosecution and paid for stolen information on hundreds of investors. Prince Stefan defended his country's policy, saying: "One can't always assume that every customer who comes through the door is a criminal. We're not going to change our whole legal system, a system which includes the protection of the privacy of our citizens."

See also 

Maria-Pia Kothbauer, Princess of Liechtenstein - Liechtenstein's Ambassador Extraordinary and Plenipotentiary to Austria and the Czech Republic
Prince Nikolaus of Liechtenstein - Former Liechtenstein's Ambassador Extraordinary and Plenipotentiary to the Holy See

References 

1961 births
Living people
Ambassadors of Liechtenstein to the Holy See
Ambassadors of Liechtenstein to Germany
Ambassadors of Liechtenstein to Switzerland
Diplomats from Klagenfurt
Princes of Liechtenstein
University of Innsbruck alumni